Dame Gladys Taylor,  (1890 – 11 January 1950) was a British military nurse and nursing administrator who served as Matron-in-Chief of Princess Mary's Royal Air Force Nursing Service from 1943 to 1948.

Born in 1890, Taylor trained at University College Hospital, London. She was appointed a Dame Commander of the Order of the British Empire in the 1949 New Year Honours.

References

External links
RCN archive of obituary for Dame Gladys Taylor, 16 January 1950
National Portrait Gallery entry

 

 
 
 

1890 births
1950 deaths
British nursing administrators
Dames Commander of the Order of the British Empire
Members of the Royal Red Cross
Princess Mary's Royal Air Force Nursing Service officers
Royal Air Force personnel of World War II